Álvaro Cervera Díaz (born 20 September 1965) is a Spanish football manager who manages Real Oviedo.

He is a former player who played as a winger. He amassed La Liga totals of 261 matches and 17 goals over 12 seasons, and represented Racing de Santander (in two spells), Mallorca and Valencia in the competition.

Cervera became a manager in 2002, going on to work with a host of clubs.

Playing career

Club
Born in Santa Isabel, Spanish Guinea when both his parents worked in that country, Cervera was raised in Santa Cruz de Tenerife and played youth football for four clubs, finishing his development at Racing de Santander. He made his La Liga debut on 9 September 1984 by playing the full 90 minutes in a 1–0 away loss against Real Valladolid, but only totalled seven games in his first two senior seasons, featuring much more regularly in 1986–87 but suffering relegation.

In the summer of 1987, Álvaro – known by his first name during his playing days – signed for RCD Mallorca, remaining five years with them and being relegated twice from the top flight. In the 1988–89 campaign he scored a career-best six goals in 35 matches, helping the Balearic Islands team to promote from Segunda División.

Álvaro moved to Valencia CF in June 1992, following Mallorca's relegation. He made 32 appearances and netted three times in his first year (notably once in a 4–1 away victory over Athletic Bilbao), but was more often than not a reserve from there onwards, for that and his following club Racing, which he left to play with Hércules CF in the second division.

Álvaro retired in 2001 at the age of nearly 36, following a spell in the lower leagues.

International
Álvaro earned four caps for Spain, in slightly more than one year. He made his debut on 4 September 1991, coming on as a 76th-minute substitute for Andoni Goikoetxea in a 2–1 friendly win against Uruguay in Oviedo.

Coaching career
Cervera took up coaching in 2001, working with amateurs Catarroja CF in several capacities. From 2004 to 2011 he managed almost exclusively in Segunda División B, and his first job at the professional level arrived in 2011–12 when he was appointed at Recreativo de Huelva in division two. However, in March 2012, he arranged to have his contract terminated when he received an offer from former side Racing Santander in the top tier, but he only collected three draws in his 13 games in charge to become the competition's worst ever debutant, and was not renewed.

On 3 July 2012, Cervera signed with Tenerife where he had already played youth football more than 30 years ago. Shortly before achieving promotion to the second division in his debut season, he renewed his link until 2015, being however relieved of his duties on 2 February 2015 even though he had a contract running until 2018.

On 18 April 2016, Cervera replaced Claudio Barragán at the helm of Cádiz CF, and managed to achieve promotion to the second tier at the end of the campaign. After coming fifth the following season, the team qualified for the play-offs for top-flight promotion, losing on regulations after a 1–1 semi-final draw to CD Tenerife in June 2017; promotion was finally gained in July 2020, ending a 14-year exile.

A quote from Cervera, "La lucha no se negocia" ("The fight is non-negotiable" in Spanish), was adopted by Cádiz as a club catchphrase shortly after his arrival. On 11 January 2022, as the club was in the relegation zone, he was sacked.

On 18 October 2022, Cervera replaced Bolo at Real Oviedo.

Managerial statistics

See also
List of Spain international footballers born outside Spain

References

External links

Racing de Santander biography 
CiberChe stats and bio 

1965 births
Living people
Equatoguinean people of Spanish descent
Sportspeople from Malabo
Spanish footballers
Footballers from the Canary Islands
Association football wingers
La Liga players
Segunda División players
Segunda División B players
Tercera División players
Rayo Cantabria players
Racing de Santander players
RCD Mallorca players
Valencia CF players
Hércules CF players
Águilas CF players
UD Almería players
CD San Fernando players
Ontinyent CF players
Spain under-21 international footballers
Spain international footballers
Spanish football managers
La Liga managers
Segunda División managers
Segunda División B managers
Tercera División managers
CD Castellón managers
Alicante CF managers
Cultural Leonesa managers
Real Jaén managers
Real Unión managers
Recreativo de Huelva managers
Racing de Santander managers
CD Tenerife managers
Cádiz CF managers
Real Oviedo managers
Villarreal CF non-playing staff